The Kathleen Shannon Award is presented by the Yorkton Film Festival.

History
In 1947 the Yorkton Film Council was founded.  In 1950 the first Yorkton Film Festival was held in Yorkton, Saskatchewan, Canada.  During the first few festivals, the films were adjudicated by audience participation through ballot casting and winners were awarded Certificates of Merit by the film festival council.  In 1958 the film council established the Yorkton Film Festival Golden Sheaf Award for the category Best of Festival, awarded to the best overall film of the festival.  Over the years various additional categories were added to the competition.   As of 2020, the Golden Sheaf Award categories included: Main Entry Categories, Accompanying Categories, Craft Categories, and Special Awards.

The Kathleen Shannon Award, is a documentary prize established by the National Film Board of Canada in 1987.  The National Film Board Kathleeen Shannon Award was added to the film festival's Special Categories competition in 1988.  The name was later changed to the Kathleen Shannon Award in 2017.  This award is presented annually by the NFB at the festival to the "filmmaker whose production reflects voices which are rarely heard."

Kathleen Shannon was a Canadian film producer, director and the executive producer of the National Film Board of Canada's Studio D.   Studio D, founded in 1974 by Shannon was the first Canadian film studio devoted to women, funded by the government.  In 1984, Shannon was awarded an honorary doctorate by the Queen's University. She was awarded the Order of Canada in 1986 and added to the List of Companions of the Order of Canada.

Winners

1980s

1990s

2000s

2010s

2020s

References 

Awards established in 1988
Yorkton Film Festival awards
Canadian documentary film awards